The Wilson Ornithological Society (WOS) is an ornithological organization that was formally established in 1886 as the Wilson Ornithological Chapter of the Agassiz Association.  It is based at the Museum of Zoology, University of Michigan, Ann Arbor, United States.  It was named after Alexander Wilson, a prominent early American ornithologist.  The name of the group later evolved through being generally known as the Wilson Ornithological Club (or just the Wilson Club) until it became the WOS in 1955.  It publishes the Wilson Journal of Ornithology (previously the Wilson Bulletin).  It is a member of the Ornithological Council.

Awards
The premier award made by WOS is the Margaret Morse Nice Medal, first awarded in 1997, commemorating notable ornithologist Margaret Morse Nice.  The recipient gives the Plenary lecture at the WOS Annual Meeting.

References

External links
 Wilson Ornithological Society

1886 establishments in Michigan
Ornithological organizations in the United States
Organizations established in 1886
Organizations based in Ann Arbor, Michigan
Environmental organizations based in Michigan
University of Michigan